Lorenzo "Toto" Ferro (born 9 November 1998) is an Argentine actor, singer and songwriter. He gained recognition for playing Robledo Puch in the 2018 film El ángel. His television roles include Cristian Pardo in the third season of El marginal (2019) and Alex Hodoyan in the third season of Narcos: Mexico (2021). Ferro releases music under the stage name Kiddo Toto. He has released two studio albums: Resfriado (2019) and Mansión helada (2021).

Early life
Lorenzo Ferro Allassia was born on 9 November 1998 in Buenos Aires. He is the eldest son of actor  and costume designer Cecilia Allassia. He grew up in Belgrano. He completed his primary school studies at a local Catholic school, and then he attended ORT.

Filmography

Film

Television

Discography

Studio albums

Singles

As lead artist

As featured artist

Guest appearances

Awards and nominations

Notes

References

External links

 
 

1998 births
21st-century Argentine male actors
21st-century Argentine male singers
Argentine male film actors
Argentine male television actors
Argentine trap musicians
Living people
Male actors from Buenos Aires
Singers from Buenos Aires